Alison Edith Hilda Drummond (22 January 1903–3 July 1984) was a New Zealand farmer, writer, historian and editor. She was born in Waitekauri, Thames/Coromandel, New Zealand on 22 January 1903. She was the grandniece of Elsdon Best. Walter Gudgeon was her maternal grandfather.

References

1903 births
1984 deaths
New Zealand farmers
New Zealand women farmers
New Zealand women historians
People from Coromandel Peninsula
20th-century New Zealand historians
20th-century New Zealand women writers